Prospero is a relatively small retrograde irregular satellite of Uranus discovered on 18 July 1999 by the astrophysicist Matthew Holman and his team, and given the provisional designation S/1999 U 3. Confirmed as Uranus XVIII it was named after the sorcerer Prospero in William Shakespeare's play The Tempest.

The orbital parameters suggest that it may belong to the same dynamic cluster as Sycorax and Setebos, suggesting common origin. However, this suggestion does not appear to be supported by the observed colours. The satellite appears neutral (grey) in visible light (colour indices B-V=0.80, R-V=0.39), similar to Setebos but different from Sycorax (which is light red).

See also 

 Uranus' natural satellites
 Irregular satellites

References

External links 
 Prospero Profile by NASA's Solar System Exploration
 David Jewitt pages
 Uranus' Known Satellites (by Scott S. Sheppard)
 MPC: Natural Satellites Ephemeris Service

Moons of Uranus
Irregular satellites
 
19990718
Moons with a retrograde orbit